Juho Kinnunen can refer to:

 Juho Kinnunen (politician) (1865-1934), Finnish clergyman and politician
 Juho Kinnunen (wrestler) (1909-1972), Finnish Olympic wrestler